Don's Party is a 1971 play by David Williamson set during the 1969 Australian federal election. The play opened on 11 August 1971 at The Pram Factory theatre in Carlton.

Plot
Don Henderson is a schoolteacher living with his wife Kath and baby son in the Melbourne suburb of Lower Plenty. On the night of the 1969 federal election Don invites a small group of friends to celebrate a predicted Australian Labor Party (ALP) election victory, much to the dismay of his wife. To the party come Mal, Don's university mentor, and his bitter wife Jenny, sex-obsessed Cooley and his latest girlfriend, nineteen-year-old Susan, Evan, a dentist, and his beautiful artist wife Kerry. Somehow, two Liberal supporters, Simon and Jody also come.

As the party wears on it becomes clear that the Labor party, which is supported by Don and most of the guests, is not winning. As a result, alcohol consumption increases, and the sniping between Don and his male friends about their failed aspirations gets uglier, as does their behaviour toward the women. Mack, a design engineer whose wife has just left him, pulls out a nude photo of her for his friends' approval. Crass womaniser Cooley pursues the available women. The disillusioned wives exchange tales of their husbands' sub-par sexual performance. By the end of the night, Don and some of his friends have begun to grasp the emptiness of their compromised lives.

The play led to a 2011 sequel, Don Parties On.

Film version

In 1976, a film version was released with a screenplay by Williamson, directed by Bruce Beresford. John Hargreaves plays Don Henderson with Jeanie Drynan as Don's wife Kath. Ray Barrett plays Mal, Don's mentor, and Pat Bishop is his wife. Graham Kennedy plays Mack, Graeme Blundell is the Liberal supporter and Veronica Lang his obedient wife. Kerry (Candy Raymond) is the attractive and assertive artist and Evan (Kit Taylor) is her uptight and possessive partner. Cooley (Harold Hopkins) comes with his young girlfriend Susan (Clare Binney).

In the film the setting is relocated to the suburb of Westleigh (7 Windam Place) in the northern suburbs of Sydney. The film also deviates from the stage version by increasing the level of profanity and contains full frontal nudity and sex scenes.

Pat Bishop won the AFI Award for Best Actress in a Leading Role, Veronica Lang won the AFI Award for Best Actress in a Supporting Role, Bruce Beresford won the Best Direction award, David Williamson won the Best screenplay award, and the film won the edit and sound award. The film was entered into the 27th Berlin International Film Festival.

Cast
 Ray Barrett as Mal, a crass former psychologist, now practising as a management consultant 
 Clare Binney as Susan, Cooley's 19-year-old girlfriend, a university student
 Pat Bishop, who was awarded the Australian Film Institute (AFI) Award for Best Actress in a Leading Role, as Jenny, Mal's long-suffering wife
 Graeme Blundell as Simon, a nervous accountant for an industrial plastic company and a Liberal supporter
 Jeanie Drynan as Kath Henderson, Don's wife, co-host of the party 
 John Hargreaves as Don Henderson, host of the party, schoolteacher 
 Harold Hopkins as Grainger Cooley, a sex-obsessed, loud-mouthed lawyer 
 Graham Kennedy as Mack, a recently separated design engineer 
 Veronica Lang, who was awarded the AFI Award for Best Actress in a Supporting Role, as Jody.
 Candy Raymond as Kerry, a rude and snooty painter who has had four major art exhibitions 
 Kit Taylor as Evan, Kerry's boyfriend, an uptight, socialist dentist
 John Gorton as himself (he was the incumbent Prime Minister of Australia at the election, and his party won a narrow victory) (cameo)
 Bruce Beresford as bottle shop attendant (cameo)

Production
In 1973 Phillip Adams was approached to make the film by Jack Lee, who wanted to direct. At the time Adams felt that comedies were the only genre of film likely to redeem themselves financially in Australia, so he felt he would easily be able to raise finance for the movie, which he did not think would cost more than $300,000. However Adams was busy at the time working on the Australia Council, which held up his involvement for 12 months; at the end of that time, Australia was in the middle of a credit squeeze and he found it more difficult than he expected to get the money.

Problems then emerged when the director Lee wanted to make the film into a broader comedy, which made Williamson uncomfortable and Adams was worried about raising finance with Lee attached, so Lee pulled out. Adams approached Ken Hannam but he lacked sympathy for the characters and found them too aggressive. Tim Burstall and Peter Weir were approached but they also turned down the film. Eventually Adams approached Bruce Beresford, who agreed.

There was some discussion that the events of the play be updated to the 1975 Federal election, but in the end it was decided to keep the screenplay faithful to the original play as it was widely believed in 1975 that Labor would lose–which was not the case in 1969. The setting was relocated to Sydney, in part because it was felt it would be cheaper but also to ensure audiences did not feel the movie was "too Melbourne". The budget was raised from the Australian Film Commission and private investors, mainly exhibitors.

Adams wanted to cast Paul Hogan as Cooley but the actor declined. Ray Barrett had played that role in London but was considered too old to do it on film, and was given the part of Mal instead. He was changed from being an ex-student to a lecturer to allow for his age. Graeme Blundell took the role of an accountant in order to escape typecasting as Alvin Purple. (Blundell had produced the original play in 1971.) 
Barry Crocker was originally meant to play Don but was replaced by John Hargreaves. Hargreaves later claimed this took place at short notice when Crocker 'broke his back... the day before rehearsals'.<ref>Tony Watts and Genevieve Picot, John Hargreaves... a Celebration: an actor's life as he saw it', Parrot Books, 2000 p.83</ref>

Shooting began in January 1976 and took roughly five weeks, using a house in Westleigh as the main location.

John Gorton played a cameo as himself as a tribute to his contribution in helping re-establish the Australian film industry.

Box Office
Phillip Adams originally distributed the film himself. Don's Party grossed $871,000 at the box office in Australia, which is equivalent to $4,503,070 in 2009 dollars.

Williamson rated the film highly saying it was "very well done".

In popular culture

The video clip to You Am I's 1998 single "What I Don't Know 'bout You" is a tribute to the film version of Don's Party''. It features scenes from the movie re-enacted by noted Australian actors, including Stephen Curry, Ben Mendelsohn, Matt Day, Tania Lacy and Nadine Garner.

See also
 Cinema of Australia

References

External links
 Don's Party at the National Film and Sound Archive
 
 Don's Party at Australian Screen Online
Don's Party at Oz Movies

1971 plays
1976 films
Australian comedy-drama films
1976 comedy-drama films
Films directed by Bruce Beresford
Films based on works by David Williamson
Films about elections
Plays by David Williamson
1976 comedy films
1976 drama films
1970s English-language films